The Roman Catholic Diocese of Hinche, erected 20 April 1972, is a suffragan of the Archdiocese of Cap-Haïtien.

Ordinaries
Jean-Baptiste Décoste (1972 - 1980)
Léonard Pétion Laroche (1982 - 1998)
Louis Kébreau, S.D.B. (1998 - 2008), appointed Archbishop of Cap-Haïtien
Simon-Pierre Saint-Hillien, C.S.C. (2009 - 2015)
Désinord Jean (2016–Present)

Territorial losses

External links and references

GCatholic.org page for this diocese

Hinche
Christian organizations established in 1972
Roman Catholic dioceses and prelatures established in the 20th century
Roman Catholic Ecclesiastical Province of Cap-Haïtien